Aerial LynnDonna Chavarin (born March 18, 1998) is an American professional soccer player who plays for Pumas Femenil of Liga Mx Femenil

Club career

Chicago Red Stars
Chavarin made her NWSL debut on September 12, 2020.

References

External links
 Yale Bulldogs profile

1998 births
Living people
American women's soccer players
Women's association football midfielders
Chicago Red Stars players
National Women's Soccer League players
Yale Bulldogs women's soccer players
Yale Bulldogs women's basketball players
Chicago Red Stars draft picks
African-American women's soccer players
21st-century African-American sportspeople
21st-century African-American women
Soccer players from California
Sportspeople from Oakland, California